Incatrechus is a genus of beetles in the family Carabidae, containing the following species:

 Incatrechus lagunensis Mateu & M.Etonti, 2006
 Incatrechus pilosus Mateu & Belles, 1982
 Incatrechus rattii M.Etonti & Mateu, 2000
 Incatrechus tenuis M.Etonti & Mateu, 2002

References

Trechinae